is a beat 'em up arcade game released by Jaleco in 1991.

Plot
The story starts out in a typical Double Dragon/Final Fight style setting at 64th Street with two protagonists: Rick (Anderson), a calm and intelligent, 35-year-old professional private detective and manager of the detective agency; and Allen (Tombs), a 19-year-old, reformed delinquent trained by Rick, who is "short-tempered and violent when angry". At the start of the plot, an evil corporation known as the Legacy organization, kidnapped the daughter of a mid-aged rich man and left him a letter explaining why they kidnapped her.

Late one night, before Rick and Allen was about to close their office, the mid-aged rich man rushed inside the office while being exhausted. He asked for help saving his daughter and gave the letter to Rick and Allen. The next day, Allen notices an advertisement in the classifieds with similar sentence structure to the letter left by the kidnappers. Allen couldn't understand it so easily, until Rick told him to look cautiously at both, the letter and the ad. They soon realised that the writing was actually a secret code, only understood by certain crime lords, so Rick and Allen struggled toward the main base of the Legacy organisation to find the truth and save the kidnapped daughter. The setting later takes on a steampunk feel as it goes along, coming to a head in a battle inside a blimp.

Gameplay

Players One and Two start with the two selectable protagonists, Rick and Allen. Each private detective uses different fighting styles, attempt to solve cases by beating up each criminal they encounter. Many special items can be found by throwing enemies into the background and breaking things, typical of this popular genre in the 1990s arcades. Along the way they are harangued by all manner of thugs and toughs, whose costumes range from 1980s hip-hop wear to stereotypical pirates. The bosses are tough by way of strange special attacks.

Legacy
64th Street spawned a series of beat 'em ups for the Nintendo Super Famicom titled Rushing Beat. The game's two protagonists later made a cameo appearance in another Jaleco game, Chimera Beast.

Further reading
Review on SlideToPlay.com
64th Street: A Detective Story – Rare Arcade Brawler Rereleases on iPhone and iPad on About.com's ClassicGames section

External links
Version on iTune by dotemu
64th Street: A Detective Story playable at the Internet Archive

References

1991 video games
Arcade video games
Arcade-only video games
Nintendo Switch games
PlayStation 4 games
Detective video games
Jaleco beat 'em ups
Video games developed in Japan
Video games set in 1939
Hamster Corporation games